Verónica Prono Tonanez (born 12 January 1978) is a former swimmer who represented Paraguay internationally.

Career 

Prono began swimming at the age of four. At thirteen she started to compete internationally for Paraguay. She won the Fair Play Award from the Paraguayan Olympic Committee in 1995. She became the first female swimmer to represent Paraguay in the Summer Olympics when she finished 49th in the women's 50 metre freestyle in 1996.

Personal life 

She is a teacher and a Bachelor of Business Administration. Prono has a swimming academy named after her.

Her nephew Genaro is also a swimmer.

References

1978 births
Living people
Paraguayan female swimmers
Olympic swimmers of Paraguay
Swimmers at the 1996 Summer Olympics
Paraguayan schoolteachers
Paraguayan women educators
Pan American Games competitors for Paraguay
Swimmers at the 1995 Pan American Games